Airy-0 is a crater inside the larger Airy Crater on Mars, whose location defined the position of the prime meridian of that planet. It is about 0.5 km (0.3 mile) across and lies within the dark region Sinus Meridiani, one of the early albedo features to be identified on Mars. The IAU Working Group on Cartographic Coordinates and Rotational Elements has now recommended setting the longitude of the Viking 1 lander (47.95137° west) as the standard.  This definition maintains the position of the center of Airy-0 at 0° longitude, within the tolerance of current cartographic uncertainties.

Merton Davies tied this crater into an extensive geodetic control network of the planet Mars based on Mariner 9 and earlier photographs.  The Mariner 9 Geodesy/Cartography Group proposed that the prime meridian of Mars be defined by the center of Airy-0, which was selected by Harold Masursky, Gerard de Vaucouleurs, and Merton Davies at a Group meeting on 14 August 1972.

It was named in honor of the British Astronomer Royal Sir George Biddell Airy (1801–1892), who in 1850 built the transit circle telescope at Greenwich. The location of that telescope was subsequently chosen to define the location of Earth's prime meridian.

References

External links 
 View of Airy-0 at Google Mars
 The Martian Prime Meridian
 Where is zero degrees longitude on Mars?
 

Impact craters on Mars
Margaritifer Sinus quadrangle
Prime meridians
Sinus Sabaeus quadrangle